Paul Cronin (8 July 1938 – 13 September 2019) was an Australian actor who played roles in the Australian television series Matlock Police and The Sullivans. He won the Silver Logie for Best Actor five times, including three years consecutively from 1978, the most awarded actor in Australia, alongside Martin Sacks.

As a young man Cronin moved to Melbourne where he worked in a variety of jobs. After actively seeking an acting career, he performed in various Crawford Productions including Division 4 and Homicide. Cronin appeared as motorcycle policeman Gary Hogan in the Crawford Productions drama Matlock Police (1971–1976), followed by its spin-off Solo One (1976). He played the central character of Dave Sullivan in the popular soap opera The Sullivans from 1976 to 1983. 

In 1986 Cronin led a consortium with Christopher Skase which was awarded the inaugural licence for the Brisbane Bears in the then-Victorian Football League. He was president of the club from 1987-1989.

Biography
Cronin was born in July 1938 in Jamestown, South Australia, and grew up in a farming family. After leaving school, Cronin became a farmer himself. He married Helen Kinnear in 1959. The couple had four daughters: twins Katherine and Jane, followed by Susanne and Juliana. 

As an athlete he had participated in the 1958 Commonwealth Games competing in the four x 100m relay. He was a state runner and also a champion gymnast.

Cronin eventually moved to Melbourne where he worked as a truck driver and a draftsman. It was at this time that he acted in various Crawford Productions including Division 4 and Homicide.

His wife Helen died in 2013.

Career
After playing several small roles, in 1971, Cronin appeared as motorcycle policeman Gary Hogan in the Crawford Productions drama Matlock Police (1971–1976). After that series ended he continued the role in the spin-off Solo One (1976), a series continuing Hogan's motorcycle police officer exploits.

After Matlock came the role as the central character of Dave Sullivan, a family patriarch in the soap opera The Sullivans. He worked in The Sullivans from 1976 to 1983. The role as Dave Sullivan won him five Silver Logies.

In the 1980s he appeared in a series of television advertisements against drunk driving with a tagline question "Would you let a friend drive home if he's had too much to drink?".

In 1998 Cronin replaced Channel Nine voice-over man Pete Smith as the alternative co-host on radio 3AW's Nightline and Remember When programs.

He was the host of lifestyle program Discover Downunder, which explores the caravan and camping industry in Australia. It was first aired on Network Ten, then the Nine Network.

Other activities
Cronin had a strong interest in Australian rules football. In 1986 he led a consortium with Christopher Skase which was awarded the inaugural licence for the Brisbane Bears in the then-Victorian Football League (VFL). The club's creation was a major step in the Victorian league becoming the national Australian Football League. He was president of the club from 1987-1989.

He was a member of the Patrons Council of the Epilepsy Foundation of Victoria.

Awards
He won the Silver Logie for best actor five times, including three years consecutively from 1978, making him the equal most awarded actor in Australia, alongside Martin Sacks. In 1980, he was given the title of the "King of Moomba", a community festival celebrated in Melbourne.

Select credits

References

External links

1938 births
2019 deaths
Australian male television actors
Logie Award winners
Male actors from South Australia
20th-century Australian male actors
21st-century Australian male actors
People from Jamestown, South Australia